Thomas H. Armstrong (born 1937) was an American politician in the state of Florida.

Armstrong was a contractor and lives in Plantation, Florida. He served in the Florida House of Representatives for the 96th district from 1982 to 1986, as a Democrat.

References

Living people
1937 births
Democratic Party members of the Florida House of Representatives